Eloise Jones may refer to:
Eloise Jones (footballer) (born 1999), Australian rules footballer
Eloise Jones (politician) (born 1917), Canadian politician